The Yongning Temple Stele is a stele erected by the Chinese Ming dynasty in 1413 with a trilingual inscription to commemorate the founding of the Yongning Temple (永寧寺) in the Nurgan outpost, near the mouth of the Amur River, by the eunuch Yishiha. The location of the temple is the village of Tyr near Nikolayevsk-on-Amur in Russia. This stele is renowned both as the latest known example of a monumental inscription in the Jurchen script, and also for the inscription of the Buddhist mantra Om mani padme hum in four different scripts on its sides.  A stele with a monolingual Chinese inscription, commemorating the repair of the temple by Yishiha, was erected in 1433.  Both monuments are now held at the Arsenyev Museum in Vladivostok.

Background
The Ming government under the Yongle Emperor (reigned 1402–1424) attempted to expand its influence in the far north and defend itself against the Mongols by setting up a system of guards and posts in the territory of the Haixi Jurchens and Jianzhou Jurchens in the Liaodong Peninsula and the area of modern Jilin province, giving official positions to the local Jurchen leaders in exchange for their allegiance.  In 1409 the Nurgan Regional Military Commission, covering the region of the lower Amur River and the island of Sakhalin, was established, but this region was under the control of the 'Wild Jurchens' who made raids on Chinese outposts.  In 1412, in response to these raids the Yongle Emperor commanded the eunuch Yishiha, a Haixi Jurchen by origin, to lead an expedition to pacify the region.  The following year Yishiha set off with a fleet of twenty-five ships and a thousand soldiers, as well as architects and craftsmen.  He sailed down the Sungari River and into the Amur River, reaching a place the Chinese called Telin 特林 (modern Tyr) where he stayed for almost a year.  Near a cliff overlooking the Amur River he built a Buddhist temple named the Temple of Eternal Tranquility (Yongning Temple).

In response to the destruction of Buddhist sculptures by local shamans, Yishiha made further expeditions to the Nurgan region in the 1420s, and in 1432–1433 he made one last expedition with 50 ships and 2,000 soldiers to invest a Jurchen chief as the new Nurgan Military Commissioner.  As the temple he had founded twenty years earlier had been destroyed, Yishiha built a new Yongning Temple, situated a short distance away from its predecessor, overlooking the Amur River.  In 1435 the Ming government abandoned its military presence in the region, and disbanded the Nurgan Regional Military Commission.

The 1413 Stele

The 1413 stele was erected at Yongning Temple to commemorate its construction by Yishiha.  The stele is 179 × 83 × 42 cm in dimensions, and is inscribed on the front with an inscription in Chinese which extols the Yongle Emperor and recounts Yishiha's expedition.  On the back of the stele are abbreviated versions of the Chinese inscription written in Mongolian and Jurchen.  On one side of the stele, the Buddhist mantra Om mani padme hum is engraved vertically in four different scripts:
 Chinese;
 Jurchen;
 Mongolian;
 Tibetan.

This stele is the latest known example of an inscription in the Jurchen script.  The earliest record of this stele was probably in book published in 1639 by a Chinese scholar called Yang Bin, but a rubbing of the actual inscription was not published until 1887 after a Qing official called Cao Tingjie made a journey along the Amur River in 1885.  The stele was removed to Vladivostok Museum in 1904.

The 1433 Stele
The 1433 stele was erected in commemoration of the rebuilding of the Yongning Temple by Yishiha in 1433.  It has a single, monolingual Chinese inscription.

See also
 Mani stone
 Stele of Sulaiman, 1348 stele with Om mani padme hum inscribed in six scripts
 Cloud Platform at Juyongguan, 1345 Buddhist structure with inscriptions in the same six scripts as the Stele of Sulaiman
 Tangut dharani pillars – two 1502 dharani pillars inscribed with the Dharani-sutra of the Victorious Buddha-Crown in Tangut script

Notes

References

Further reading
 Головачев В. Ц., Ивлиев А. Л., Певнов А. М., Рыкин П. О. "Тырские стелы XV века: Перевод, комментарии, исследование китайских, монгольского и чжурчжэньского текстов"  (Golovachev V. Ts., Ivliev A. L., Pevnov A. M., Rykin P. O. The Tyr Steles of the 15th Century: Translations, commentaries, study of the Chinese, Mongolian and Jurchen texts). Russian Academy of Sciences, Institute for linguistic studies; Institute of History, Archaeology and Ethnography of the Peoples of Far East, Far Eastern Branch; Institute of Oriental studies. St. Petersburg, Nauka, 2011.  

15th-century inscriptions
Chinese steles
Jurchen script
Tibetan script
Ming dynasty art